Euphaedra jacksoni is a butterfly in the family Nymphalidae. It is found in Gabon and the Republic of the Congo.

References

Butterflies described in 1980
jacksoni